Riverside, The Farnsley–Moremen Landing is a historic  farm and house in south end Louisville, Kentucky, along the banks of the Ohio River. The house, a red brick I-house with a two-story Greek Revival

The house was listed on the National Register of Historic Places in 1979 as Farnsley-Moremen House.

Farnsley died in 1849 without a will, and after a dozen years of legal wrangling over his estate by his family, the ownership of the property was purchased by the successful Moremen family of Brandenburg in 1862.

From around 1862 to 1900, the property served as a river transportation hub. A riverboat landing on the property allowed people traveling by river to stop to trade goods, pick up boiler wood for fuel, or rest. The Moremen family nicknamed the landing "Soap Landing", as they sold lye soap and other household and agricultural products there. In addition, a ferry carried people and goods back and forth between the landing and Indiana. They would build a float barge and load full of agricultural products and livestock and float down the river to New Orleans.  With the money earned would sow into their pants, buy horses and return home.  One year Henry Clay rode the float barge stumping for President Abraham Lincoln.  Long in his oration at every stop they ran into very cold conditions.  The barge was frozen in place and all goods had to be unloaded and sold.

Like many other structures along the Ohio River, the house was damaged by the Ohio River flood of 1937.  After the county condemned a portion of the property to build a retention wall that left the historical farm outside the wall stripped of its top soil, the future became unclear for the family.

The Moremen family managed the property until 1988, when they sold it to Jefferson County Fiscal Court for purposes of restoration, promotion and preservation of the families history. On October 10, 1993, the restored house was debuted to the public.

A visitors center situated on the property houses an auditorium, museum exhibits and a store.

History of residents

10,000 B.C. – 1700 A.D. Prehistoric Native Americans: The first settlers of Riverside
Native American hunters and gathers lived in the Ohio Valley as early as 10,000 B.C.  Some of these people may have camped or hunted near what is today Riverside. About 6,000 B.C., groups of hunters and gathers established base camps.  They began to take advantage of the abundant resources of the river valley such as mussels, fish, plants and larger animals in the area.

Around 1,000 to 500 A.D., these prehistoric Native American groups had become more sedentary and began to establish longer term camps. They began some agriculture in the area as a result of relying more heavily on cultivated plants and maize, in particular.  This period was the introduction of pottery, the bow and arrow and larger emphasis on ritual activities.

Evidence found by archaeologist include stone tools, pottery, fire pits, storage pits, and postholes from houses.  Archaeologist identified a prehistoric cemetery on the property.  Which shows that people continually lived and died on the property for thousands of years.

Some of these Native American groups made contact with the first European explorers and settlers to conduct trade.  By the early-nineteenth century, native peoples had all but disappeared from what is now Kentucky.

1822–1826 First European Settler: Ebenezer Christopher
Ebenezer Christopher was an owner of the property and resided there, now known as Riverside.  In 1822, Christopher purchased 200 acres (0.8 km2) thirteen miles (19 km) southwest of Louisville on the Ohio River for $2,000.  He bought the land from absentee owners James D. Breckenridge and Thomas D. Carneal, who were both residents of Dinwiddle County, Virginia.  Records indicate Ebenezer, his wife Polly, and their six children were already living on the farm at the time of purchase.

A residential structure does appear on the 1821 Ohio River navigation map. Christopher owned the property for four years and farmed until his death in 1826.  He died in debt and the bank took over ownership of his estate.

1828–1831 Gabriel Farnsley
Soon after the death of Ebenezer Christopher, the 200 acre (0.8 km2) Riverside tract was sold at public auction to Joseph Reed for $1,600.  Reed owned the property for only a few months before he sold it to a southwest Jefferson County resident named Gabriel Farnsley and business partner Ebenezer Williams in 1828.  In 1831, Farnsley bought out Williams' share to become its sole owner.

c. 1838: Building a brick house

An increase in the amount of taxes paid by Gabriel Farnsley between 1837 and 1839 supports an addition to the existing residence that was then clad in brick.  There is a brick inscribed with Farnsley name as record he was involved.

Farnsley has been described only as a wealthy bachelor, fox hunter and "high liver".  Accordingly, to local legend he was a disappointed suitor and committed suicide at the site. He was stood  up at the altar.  He would never marry and had no children and died without a will.

1849 End of the Farnsley ownership
Gabriel Farnsley died in June 1849.  He had left no will.  Most Farnsley property was sold at public auction in early 1850.  However, the ultimate settlement of Farnsley's estate took almost a dozen years.  Soon after his death, his siblings, nieces, and nephews became embroiled in litigation over the estate.  The complex series of cases involved twenty-one parties.

1860–1862 The Moremen era begins
By 1860, the long running court battle among Farnsley's heirs was settled and the Moremen family put down roots at this farm site.  The property was owned with clear title by a farmer named Megowan in 1858.

Alanson and Rachel Moremen moved upriver from Brandenburg, Kentucky bringing seven children. Their era would span more than a century and a quarter and last for multiple generations where great successes in agriculture, love stock, orchards, and many other products would serve many communities.

1870 Riverside farm thrives
Agriculture records from 1870 show Alanson and Rachel Moremen created a thriving and diverse farming venture on the Ohio River.  In 1870, Moremen owned  of land.  Three hundred acres (1.2 km2) were wooded, while  were described as improved.  His livestock holding included: nine horses, eight mules, seven dairy cows, three oxen, twenty cattle, forty sheep, and 170 swine.  Moremen crops and farm products were valued at $19,000 in 1870.  Products included winter wheat, rye, corn, oats, barley, potatoes, sweet potatoes, wine, butter, hay, beeswax, and honey.

1886 Second generation: Israel and Nannie Moremen
The farm at Riverside passed into the hands of the second generation of Moremens in 1886.  The youngest of Alanson and Rachel's children, Israel Putnam Moremen, and his new wife Nannie Storts Moremen, were deeded the house and 200 acres of land.  Israel Moremen's family continued to farm on the property.  They kept chickens and hogs, and ran a dairy.  Orchards produced apples and pears.  The family cultivated crops of corn, pole beans, alfalfa, soy beans, potatoes, and pasture grasses.  Israel, in addition, worked for eight years as the Valley Station Post Master.

1890-1930s Changing relationship to the river
The riverboat landing on the farm apparently remained operational through the first decade of the twentieth century.  However, the development of the railroad, streetcar, and automobile turned the focus away from the river.  Soon the Moremen family began using the original Grand Entrance as a back door to the house.  In spite of this movement away from the river, it remains an important presence in the family.  The riverbank was the site for picnics, family gatherings and swimming expeditions.

1937 The great flood
In 1937, the farm experienced the damaging power of the river.  After days of rain, Jefferson County saw the worst flooding in recorded history.  Widowed Israel was still living in the house with daughter Marjorie Collett and her family at the time.  Approximately six feet of muddy Ohio River water entered the house.  This was the only time the house was flooded.  Fortunately, the family were able to move most of their possessions upstairs.

See also
Farmington Historic Plantation
Historic Locust Grove
List of attractions and events in the Louisville metropolitan area
List of parks in the Louisville metropolitan area
Oxmoor Farm — larger historical farm in the Louisville area

References

External links

Official site
Google Satellite Map

Houses completed in 1838
19th-century buildings and structures in Louisville, Kentucky
Houses in Louisville, Kentucky
Parks in Louisville, Kentucky
Museums in Louisville, Kentucky
Local landmarks in Louisville, Kentucky
National Register of Historic Places in Louisville, Kentucky
Historic house museums in Kentucky
I-houses in Kentucky
Houses on the National Register of Historic Places in Kentucky
Farms on the National Register of Historic Places in Kentucky
1838 establishments in Kentucky
Greek Revival architecture in Kentucky
Plantations in Kentucky